Ataq Airport  is an airport serving Ataq, the capital city of the Shabwah Governorate in Yemen.

Facilities

References

External links
 
 

Airports in Yemen
Shabwah Governorate